The episodes of the Yozakura Quartet anime are based on the manga series of the same name by Suzuhito Yasuda. They are directed by Kou Matsuo and produced by the animation studio Nomad. The plot of the episodes follows the members of the Hiizumi Life Counseling Office, Akina Hiizumi, a human that can use "tuning" to return yōkai to their world; Hime Yarizakura, a dragon yōkai who is the mayor of the town of Sakurashin; Ao Nanami, a satori with telepathic abilities; and Kotoha Isone, a half-human, half-yōkai who can conjure objects with her words. Together, they protect the townspeople of Sakurashin, a city where humans and yōkai coexist with one another.

The episodes aired from October 2, 2008 to December 18, 2008 on Tokyo Broadcasting System in Japan. Other networks that broadcast the episodes include BS-i, Chubu-Nippon Broadcasting, and Mainichi Broadcasting System. The anime adaptation of the manga was first confirmed in Kodansha's Monthly Shōnen Sirius magazine on March 26, 2008.

Two pieces of theme music are used for the episodes: one opening theme and one closing theme. Singles that contain the theme songs and other tracks have been released; the single for "Just Tune" was released on October 16, 2008 and the single for "Nagareboshi" was released on October 22, 2008. A DVD compilation, which contains the first two episodes of the anime, was released on December 17, 2008 by Pony Canyon. Five more DVD compilations, each containing two episodes are slated for release between January 21, 2009 and May 20, 2009.

Episode list

2008 Series

OVA series

Hana no Uta

References
General

Specific

External links
Official website for the anime (Archived) 
Official Tokyo Broadcasting Network website for the anime 

Yozakura Quartet